Lech Rzewuski (1941–2004) was a Polish painter.

1941 births
2004 deaths
20th-century Polish painters
21st-century Polish painters
20th-century Swedish painters
20th-century Polish male artists
Swedish male painters
21st-century Swedish painters
20th-century Swedish male artists
21st-century Swedish male artists